Shokranlu (also Romanized as Shokrānlū; also known as Shokrānlū-ye Bālā and Shokrānlū Bālā) is a village in Sivkanlu Rural District, in the Central District of Shirvan County, North Khorasan Province, Iran. At the 2006 census, its population was 74, in 19 families.

References 

Populated places in Shirvan County